Ingmar Bergman Makes a Movie is a 1963 Swedish documentary film directed by Vilgot Sjöman which depicts the making of Ingmar Bergman's film Winter Light from screenwriting to the film's premiere and critical reaction.

The film originally aired in five half-hour episodes on Swedish television. It has subsequently been included in a bonus disc of The Criterion Collection's box set of Bergman's "trilogy," Through a Glass Darkly (1961), Winter Light, and The Silence (1963).

Production
Sjöman was beginning to write screenplays, and wishing to learn about directing, asked Bergman if he could observe him making a film.  Sjöman then approached Sveriges Television who were interested in airing a documentary about the process. Shooting of the documentary began after the Winter Light screenplay was finished.

Bergman allowed for Sjöman's crew to film rehearsals, but not the actual shooting.  Bergman was also interviewed for the project. The documentary was shot on 16 mm film. After working with Bergman and on the documentary, Sjöman's own films received attention, starting with 491.

Broadcast
The documentary began airing on SVT on 27 January 1963. It was generally not available in Region 1 until The Criterion Collection released it in its Bergman trilogy box set.

Reception
Writing for Epinions in 2007, scholar Stephen O. Murray called the film "A valuable document of a master craftsman working in top form."  He also stated that "Sjöman comes across as very earnest and relatively probing." Brian Burke of DVD Verdict called it the "best documentary I've ever seen on the filmmaking process," adding Bergman appears "candid, relaxed, and animated."

Swedish musicologist Per F. Broman said the documentary has "fascinating insights" into the use of sound in the film. In 2015, Dagens Nyheter referred to the documentary as slightly forgotten, but noted SVT would be rerunning it along with other Bergman-related programming between 25 October and 27 December.

References

External links
 
Documenting Winter Light an essay by Vilgot Sjöman at the Criterion Collection

1963 films
Documentary films about films
Films directed by Vilgot Sjöman
Ingmar Bergman
Swedish documentary films
1960s Swedish-language films
1963 documentary films
1960s Swedish films